The 1931 Salvadoran coup d'état occurred on 2 December 1931. The coup overthrew President Arturo Araujo and led to the establishment of the Civic Directory. The coup began 48 years of military rule in El Salvador which lasted until the 1979 Salvadoran coup d'état.

Coup and Directory 

The Salvadoran Armed Forces toppled the government of the democratically elected President, Arturo Araujo, the candidate of the Labor Party. During his administration, El Salvador faced political tension and public unrest. Tax reforms also failed to succeed due to resistance from the wealthy class.

The final straw for the coup was an attempt to reduce the military budget which was met by heavy resistance by military officers. With the government being unable to pay wages to military officers, the army staged the coup to remove Arturo Araujo’s administration at 10 p.m. on 2 December 1931.

The military officers established the Civic Directory as a provisional government whose members were: Colonel Osmín Aguirre y Salinas, Colonel Juan Vicente Vidal, Colonel Joaquín Valdés, Captain Manuel Urbina, Captain Visitación Antonio Pacheco, Lieutenant Joaquín Castro Canizales, Lieutenant Carlos Rodríguez, Sub-Lieutenant Julio Cañas, Sub-Lieutenant José Alonso Huezo, Sub-Lieutenant Miguel Hernández Saldaña, Sub-Lieutenant Héctor Montalvo, Sub-Lieutenant Juan Ramón Munés.

Legacy 

The Directory was dissolved on 4 December and Maximiliano Hernández Martínez assumed the Presidency as “Acting President”. He would later officially become President on 1 March 1935.

The coup led to the subsequent 1932 Salvadoran peasant massacre where Feliciano Ama and Farabundo Martí lead poor Salvadoran peasants in a communist rebellion against Martínez’s government leading to 25,000 deaths.

The United States did not recognize the legitimacy of Hernández Martínez's rise to power or government due to the 1923 Central American Treaty of Peace and Amity and only recognized his government after his government put down the communist uprising in early 1932.

References 

1930s coups d'état and coup attempts
1931 in El Salvador
1931